Thiemo de Bakker won the first edition of the tournament 6–4, 3–6, 7–5 in the final against Victor Hănescu.

Seeds

Draw

Finals

Top half

Bottom half

References
 Main Draw
 Qualifying Draw

SDA Tennis Open - Singles
2012 Singles